The 1976 presidential election in Maine took place on November 2, 1976, as part of the 1976 United States presidential election, which took place across all 50 states plus the District of Columbia. Voters chose four representatives, or electors to the electoral college, to vote for president and vice president.

Maine narrowly voted for incumbent Republican president Gerald Ford over his Democratic opponent, Georgia Governor Jimmy Carter. Ford took 48.91% of the vote to Carter’s 48.07%, a victory margin of 0.84%. The anti-war former Democratic senator from Minnesota, Eugene McCarthy, received 2.21% of the vote in Maine, which possibly helped Ford carry the state, as he most likely siphoned more votes from Carter than Ford.

Despite his narrow loss nationwide, Ford actually managed to carry four of the six New England states. Carter only won the heavily Democratic states of Massachusetts and Rhode Island, which made New England Ford's second strongest region in the nation after the West.

, this is the last time that a Democrat won the national election without carrying Maine.

Results

Results by congressional district
Ford won both of Maine's congressional districts.

Results by county

See also
 United States presidential elections in Maine

References

Maine
1976
1976 Maine elections